Claude Tresmontant (5 August 1925 – 16 April 1997) was a French philosopher, Hellenist, and theologian.

Biography 

Claude Tresmontant taught medieval philosophy and philosophy of science at the Sorbonne. He was a member of the Academy of Moral and Political Science. He was given the Maximilien-Kolbe Prize in 1973 and the Grand Prix of the Academy of Moral and Political Science for his complete works in 1987.

Works 

  Essai sur la pensée hébraïque, éd. O.E.I.L., 1953 (republishing 1956).
  Études de métaphysique biblique, éd. O.E.I.L., 1955 (republishing 1998).
  Introduction à la pensée de Teilhard de Chardin, Éditions du Seuil, 1956.
  Saint Paul et le mystère du Christ, Éditions du Seuil, Collections Microcosme « Maîtres spirituels », 1956 (republishing 2006).
  La doctrine morale des prophètes d'Israël, Éditions du Seuil, 1958.
  Essai sur la connaissance de Dieu, Éditions du Cerf, 1959.
  Maurice Blondel. Lucien Laberthonnière. Correspondance philosophique, éd. O.E.I.L., 1961.
  La métaphysique du christianisme et la naissance de la philosophie chrétienne, Éditions du Seuil, 1961 (republishing 1968).
  Les idées maîtresses de la métaphysique chrétienne, Éditions du Seuil, 1962.
  Les origines de la philosophie chrétienne, éd. O.E.I.L., 1962.
  Introduction à la métaphysique de Maurice Blondel, Éditions du Seuil, 1963.
  La métaphysique du christianisme et la crise du XIIIe siècle, Éditions du Seuil, 1964.
  Comment se pose aujourd'hui le problème de l'existence de Dieu, Éditions du Seuil, 1966 (republishing 2002).
  Le problème de la Révélation, Éditions du Seuil, 1969.
  L'enseignement de Ieschoua de Nazareth, Éditions du Seuil, 1970 (republishing 1980).
  Sciences de l'univers et problèmes métaphysiques, Éditions du Seuil, 1970.
  Le problème de l'âme, Éditions du Seuil, 1971.
  Le problème de l'athéisme, Éditions du Seuil, 1972.
  Introduction à la théologie chrétienne, Éditions du Seuil, 1974.
  La mystique chrétienne et l'avenir de l'homme, Éditions du Seuil, 1977.
  La crise moderniste, Éditions du Seuil, 1979 (republishing 1988).
  Problèmes du christianisme, Éditions du Seuil, 1980.
  Le prophétisme hébreu, éd. O.E.I.L., 1982 (republishing 1997).
  Le Christ hébreu, présentation et imprimatur de Monseigneur Jean-Charles Thomas, éd. O.E.I.L., 1983 (republishing 1992).
  Apocalypse de Jean, éd. O.E.I.L., 1984 (republishing 2005).
  Évangile de Jean, éd. O.E.I.L., 1984.
  L'Histoire de l'Univers et le sens de la Création, éd. O.E.I.L., 1985 (republishing 2006).
  Évangile de Matthieu, éd. O.E.I.L., 1986 (republishing 1996).
  L'opposition métaphysique au monothéisme hébreu : de Spinoza à Heidegger, éd. O.E.I.L., 1986.
  Évangile de Luc, éd. O.E.I.L., 1987.
  Les premiers éléments de la théologie, François-Xavier de Guibert, éd. O.E.I.L., 1987.
  Évangile de Marc, éd. O.E.I.L., 1988.
  Schaoul qui s'appelle aussi Paulus. La théorie de la métamorphose, éd. O.E.I.L., 1988.
  Les métaphysiques principales : essai de typologie, éd. O.E.I.L., 1989.
  Les malentendus principaux de la théologie, éd. O.E.I.L., 1990 (republishing 2007).
  Les Évangiles : Jean, Matthieu, Marc, Luc, éd. O.E.I.L., 1991 (republishing 2007).
  Problèmes de notre temps : chroniques, éd. O.E.I.L, 1991.
  La question du miracle : à propos des Évangiles : analyse philosophique, éd. O.E.I.L., 1992.
  Enquête sur l'Apocalypse : auteur, datation, signification, éd. O.E.I.L., 1994.
  L'activité métaphysique de l'intelligence et la théologie, éd. O.E.I.L., 1996.
  Le Bon et le Mauvais. Christianisme et politique, éd. O.E.I.L., 1996.
  La finalité de la Création, le salut et le risque de perdition, éd. O.E.I.L., 1996.
  Judaïsme et christianisme, éd. O.E.I.L., 1996.
  La pensée de l'Église de Rome. Rome et Constantinople, éd. O.E.I.L., 1996.
  La Prescience de Dieu, la prédestination et la liberté humaine, éd. O.E.I.L., 1996.
  La question de l'immortalité de l'âme, éd. O.E.I.L., 1996.
  La christologie du bienheureux Jean Duns Scot, l'Immaculée Conception et l'avenir de l'Église, Éditions du Seuil, 1997.
  Quel avenir pour le christianisme ? : « Tâches de la pensée chrétienne aujourd'hui » et autres textes sur la problématique générale du christianisme, éd. O.E.I.L., 2001.
  Réalisme intégral : Claude Tresmontant, métaphysicien de la création ; Anthologie de l'œuvre publiée, présentation Paul Mirault, préface Yves Tourenne, éd. François-Xavier de Guibert, 2012.

References 

Academic staff of the University of Paris
1925 births
1997 deaths
French male non-fiction writers
20th-century French philosophers
20th-century French male writers
French hellenists
French Hebraists